Kaluarachchige Nandadasa Gunasinghe (15 March 1944 – 2 March 2006) was a Sri Lankan politician. A member of the Sri Lanka Freedom Party, Gunasinghe represented the Sri Lankan parliament for Galle district from 1994 to 2001. Gunasinghe later entered the Southern Provincial Council as a Provincial Councillor. He also served as the Chairman of the Dhakshina Sanwardena Adhikariya (Southern Development Authority) and as a Director of the Water Board.

Formerly a school teacher who joined the Sri Lanka Freedom Party in 1977, he subsequently became the chief organiser of the Habaraduwa electorate. Gunasinghe had his education at Vidyaloka College, Galle and Faculty of Arts, University of Colombo. He died on 2 March 2006 at the age of 62. His son Thisara is also involved in politics. He is currently working as a Habaraduwa chief organiser of the Sri Lanka Freedom Party.

References

External links
Hon. Gunasinghe, Kaluarachchige Nandadasa, M.P.

Members of the 11th Parliament of Sri Lanka
Members of the 10th Parliament of Sri Lanka
Sri Lanka Freedom Party politicians
1944 births
2006 deaths
Alumni of Vidyaloka College